Herbert B. Fredersdorf (2 October 1899 – 21 July 1971) was a German film editor, screenwriter and film director.

Selected filmography

Director
 Nordlicht (1938)
 Alarm (1941)
 Long Is the Road (1948)
 König Drosselbart (1954)
 Rumpelstilzchen (1955)
 The Dairymaid of St. Kathrein (1955)
 Der gestiefelte Kater (1955)
 Forest Liesel (1956)
  (1957)

Editor
 Montparnasse Girl (1932)
 Gypsies of the Night (1932)
 Night Convoy (1932)
 Laughing Heirs (1933)
 Happy Days in Aranjuez (1933)
 Playing with Fire (1934)
 Count Woronzeff (1934)
 The Csardas Princess (1934)
 Make Me Happy (1935)
 Under Blazing Heavens (1936)
 The Beggar Student (1936)
 Daphne and the Diplomat (1937)
 Between the Parents (1938)
 The Mystery of Betty Bonn (1938)
 Die Erbin vom Rosenhof (1942)
 With the Eyes of a Woman (1942)
 Ball of Nations (1954)

Screenwriter
 The Fox of Paris (1957)

Bibliography
 Shandley, Robert R. Rubble Films: German Cinema in the Shadow of the Third Reich. Temple University Press, 2001.

External links

1899 births
1971 deaths
Film people from Saxony-Anhalt
Mass media people from Magdeburg